Asaperda sylvicultrix is a species of beetle in the family Cerambycidae. It was described by Toyoshima and Iwata in 1990.

References

Asaperda
Beetles described in 1990